Peter Michael (born 9 May 1989) is a New Zealand long track speed skater and multiple world champion inline speed skater. He is since December 2020 a member of the Dutch .

Michael won a total of 12 (4 Junior, 8 Senior) titles at the world inline skating championships and two medals at The World Games; in 2013 (gold) and 2017 (bronze). He has also been competing in ice speed skating since 2016. In 2017, he won silver and bronze medals at the World Single Distance Championships in Gangneung, South Korea. Michael competed at the 2018 Winter Olympics, where his best finish was 4th in both the 5000 metres and the team pursuit.

References

External links
Peter Michael at pyeongchang2018.com
Inline World Championship results excluding 2016 at world-inline-cup.com
Inline World Championship results 2016 at www.rollersports.org

1989 births
Inline speed skaters
New Zealand male speed skaters
Olympic speed skaters of New Zealand
Speed skaters at the 2018 Winter Olympics
Speed skaters at the 2022 Winter Olympics
Living people
World Single Distances Speed Skating Championships medalists
World Games gold medalists
World Games bronze medalists
Competitors at the 2013 World Games
Competitors at the 2017 World Games